"Good Lovin' Ain't Easy to Come By" is a duet released in 1969 on the Tamla label by singers Marvin Gaye and Tammi Terrell.

The first release off the duo's third album, Easy, it has been hugely debated whether or not an ailing Terrell, who was dying from a brain tumor, was on the track or if the song's co-writer, Valerie Simpson, subbed for Terrell.

In his biography, Divided Soul: The Life of Marvin Gaye, Marvin said Tammi was too ill to record, but Motown pushed for another Marvin/Tammi record. Marvin refused, calling it inhuman, until the label convinced him the album would cover for Terrell and her family, so Gaye and Simpson sung as if it were a Gaye/Terrell duet.

However, in Terrell's sister Ludie Montgomery's book, My Sister Tommie: The Real Tammi Terrell, Simpson reportedly denied she took part in the song saying Terrell was assisted to the studio to record her part. Whatever the reason, the song became an international top forty hit for the duo reaching number thirty on the pop chart and number twenty-six on the UK pop singles chart.

Cash Box praised the song's "belting rhythmic accompaniment, loverly lyric and the twosome's distinctive impact."

The recording was featured in the film The Boys in the Band.

Personnel
All vocals by Marvin Gaye and Tammi Terrell/Valerie Simpson
Produced and written by Ashford & Simpson
Instrumentation by The Funk Brothers

Further reading
Ritz, David, Divided Soul: The Life of Marvin Gaye (1985, 2003; in the book Gaye said Simpson subbed Terrell for vocals on the Easy album)
Montgomery, Ludie, My Sister Tommie: The Real Tammi Terrell (2005; in this book Simpson denies subbing for Terrell)

References

1969 singles
Marvin Gaye songs
Tammi Terrell songs
Songs written by Nickolas Ashford
Songs written by Valerie Simpson
Male–female vocal duets
1969 songs
Song recordings produced by Ashford & Simpson
Tamla Records singles